The Christiad (Latin Christias) is an epic poem in six cantos on the life of Jesus Christ by Marco Girolamo (Marcus Hieronymus) Vida modeled on Virgil. It was first published in Cremona in 1535 (see 1535 in poetry).

Modern Editions 

 Vida, Marco Girolamo. The Christiad: A Latin-English Edition.  Edited and translated by Gertrude C. Drake and Clarence A. Forbes. Carbondale and Edwardsville, IL: Southern Illinois University Press, 1978.  
 Vida, Marco Girolamo. Christiad. Translated by James Gardner. The I Tatti Renaissance Library, no. 39, ed. James Hankins. Cambridge, MA: Harvard University Library, 2009. .

References

External links 

 John Cranwell's English translation (scan) of Vida 
 Edward Granan's translation (scan) 
 Another Christiad (not Vida's), by Henry Kirke White (scan).
 A Christiad by William Alexander (scan, pp. 71sqq).
 Vida's Christiad in the original Latin: Marci Herionymi Vidae...Christiados Libri Sex (1536). 
 Adam Roberts’s translation and commentary.

1535 books
16th-century poems
Christian poetry
Epic poems in Latin
Depictions of Jesus in literature
16th-century Latin books